Panglong is a town in Namtu Township, Kyaukme District in northern Shan State, Burma. It is a ruby mining town.

References

Populated places in Shan State